Fusinus marisinicus is a species of sea snail, a marine gastropod mollusc in the family Fasciolariidae, the spindle snails, the tulip snails and their allies.

Description
The length of the shell attains 172.5 mm.

Distribution
This species occurs in the East China Sea.

References

 Callomon P. & Snyder M.A. (2009) On some Fusinus from the East and South China Seas (Mollusca: Gastropoda: Fasciolariidae), with description of a new species. Proceedings of the Academy of Natural Sciences of Philadelphia 158: 209-219
 Callomon P. & Snyder M.A. (2019). The genus Fusinus in the northwestern Pacific. Special Publication of the Malacological Society of Japan. 4: 1-122 page(s): 33, figs 68-70

marisinicus
Gastropods described in 2009